Connie Smith is the debut studio album by American country music artist Connie Smith. It was released in March 1965 on RCA Victor Records and was produced by Bob Ferguson. The album included Smith's debut single, "Once a Day". The song became her signature recording and biggest hit, reaching number one on the Billboard country songs chart.

The album would also reach the top spot of the Top Country Albums chart in 1965, spending multiple weeks at the top of the chart. Connie Smith would be the start of a series of album releases by Smith on the RCA label for the next nine years.

Background and content 
Connie Smith rose to country music stardom with the 1964 song "Once a Day". Penned by Bill Anderson, the disc topped the country chart and prompted her record label to release her debut studio album. The album was recorded at RCA Studio B in Nashville, Tennessee. Sessions were held between July and November 1964. The production for the album was performed by Bob Ferguson. It featured the background vocalists, The Anita Kerr Singers. Six of the songs on the album were written by singer-songwriter, Bill Anderson, including "Once a Day" and "Then and Only Then." Also included was Smith's cover of Charlie Louvin's "I Don't Love You Anymore". Additionally, singer and songwriter Willie Nelson composed the album's track, "Darling, Are You Ever Coming Home".

Release and reception 
Smith's eponymous album was released in March 1965 on RCA Victor Records. It was the debut album in her career. It was issued as a vinyl LP album, with six tracks on each side of the record. Connie Smith peaked at number one on the Top Country Albums chart, spending 7 weeks on top of the albums chart, and 30 weeks overall. "Once a Day" was released in August 1964, and peaked at number one on November 28, spending eight weeks at the top spot. "Then and Only Then" was released as the follow-up single in early 1965, peaking within the Top 5 on the country charts. In addition, both songs also placed in the Bubbling Under Hot 100. A digital version of the original album was released in later years by Sony Music Entertainment.

The album was reviewed by AllMusic and received five out of five stars. Reviewer, Dan Cooper called Smith's voice to be, "blowing through the Nashville Sound production like a down-home Streisand fronting The Lennon Sisters." Slipcue.com reviewed the album and gave it a positive review, calling the sound, "Nashville Girl Group at its best." The songs "Once a Day," "Tiny Blue Transistor Radio," and "I Don't Love You Anymore" as "classic examples of the style." The website later concluded by stating, "Them folks at the label could make a lot of people really happy if they just reissued this album whole, as is, and let us hear what Smith sounded like coming out the gate. A doozy."

Track listings

Original version

Digital version

Personnel 
All credits are adapted from the liner notes of Connie Smith.

Musical personnel
 Harold Bradley – guitar
 Floyd Chance – bass
 Dorothy Dillard – background vocals
 Ray Edenton – guitar
 Dolores Edgin – background vocals
 Karl Garvin – background vocals
 Priscilla Hubbard – background vocals
 Jerry Kennedy – guitar
 Anita Kerr – background vocals
 Jimmy Lance – guitar
 Leonard Miller – drums
 Weldon Myrick – steel guitar
 Louis Nunley – background vocals
 Harold Ragsdale – background vocals
 Hargus "Pig" Robbins – piano
Connie Smith - lead vocals, harmony vocals
 William Wright – background vocals

Chart performance

Release history

References 

1965 debut albums
Connie Smith albums
Albums produced by Bob Ferguson (music)
RCA Victor albums